Neuquén is a province of Argentina, located in the west of the country, at the northern end of Patagonia. It borders Mendoza Province to the north, Rio Negro Province to the southeast, and Chile to the west. It also meets La Pampa Province at its northeast corner.

History

The Neuquén Province receives its name from the Neuquén River.
The term "Neuquén" derives from the Mapudungun word "Nehuenken" meaning drafty, which the aborigines used for the river. The word (without the accentuation) is a palindrome.

Lácar Department in Neuquén Province has the southernmost known remains of maize before it was further diffused by the Inca Empire. Maize remains were found as far south as 40°19' S in Melinquina, with it being found inside pottery dated to 730 ±80 BP and 920 ±60 BP. This maize was probably brought across the Andes from Chile.

Inhabited by Tehuelches and Pehuenche, the territory was initially explored by conquistadores coming from Chile. In 1670 a Jesuit priest established in Chiloé Archipelago, Nicolás Mascardi, founded the Jesuit mission Nuestra Senora de Nahuel Huapi. The Jesuit missions lasted few years and the last mission in Neuquén was destroyed in 1717. The suppression of the Society of Jesus in 1767 halted further missionary activity.

Royalist hideout
During the independence wars rumours about the imminent arrival of Spanish troops to Patagonia, either from Peru or Chiloé, were common among indigenous peoples of the Pampas and northern Patagonia. The last royalist armed group in what is today Argentina and Chile, the Pincheira brothers, moved from the vacinities of Chillán across the Andes into northern Neuquén as patriots consolidated control of Chile. The Pincheira brothers was a large mounted outlaw gang made of Europeans Spanish, American Spanish, Mestizos and local indigenous peoples. This group was able to move to Patagonia thanks to its alliance with two indigenous tribes, the Ranqueles and the Boroanos. Varvarco, far from the de facto territory of the Republic of Chile and the United Provinces of the Río de la Plata, the Pincheira brothers established a permanent encampment with thousands of settlers. From this and other bases the Pincheira brothers led numerous raids into the countryside of the newly established republics.

Integration to Argentina (1875–1955)
The Neuquén area came under Argentine influence after explorer Perito Francisco Moreno made several trips to Patagonia and made accurate descriptions of the area in his book "Viaje al Pais de las Manzanas", reaching Nahuel Huapi lake in 1875. In 1879 Julio Argentino Roca started the Conquest of the Desert (Conquista del Desierto) that finally broke the aboriginal resistance. In 1884 Patagonia's political divisions were restructured and the Territory of Neuquén acquired its current boundaries. The capital of the province moved several times to Norquín (1884–85), Campana Mahuida (current Loncopué) (1885–1888), Chos Malal (1885–1901), and finally Confluencia currently known as Neuquén.

At the beginning of the 20th century the railway reached the city of Neuquén, and a new irrigation system was finished, facilitating the production and later transportation of crops. Petroleum was found in Plaza Huincul in 1918, giving Neuquén a new push forward.

Local politics have long been dominated by a single political party, the MPN or Movimiento Popular Neuquino founded by Elias Sapag, a prosperous businessman born in Lebanon.

Migrating to Argentina, the Sapag family arrived in Neuquén Territory around 1910 with the railroad, eventually making their home in Zapala, whose dry, fertile mountain valleys and orchards were reminiscent of their native Lebanon. Neuquén is rich in natural resources such as natural gas, petroleum, virgin forests and water resources suitable for electric power and tourism alike. These resources were formerly managed by the central National Government, which resulted in little local benefit at the time. Because of social unrest, Elias Sapag and two younger brothers, Felipe and Amado, started the MPN, an active political movement rooted in federalism and greater local rights over the territory and its resources.

Argentine Province (1955–present)
The territory was made a province on June 15, 1955, and its constitution promulgated on November 28, 1957. Felipe Sapag soon became politically prominent.  Although he was elected governor in 1962 representing the Movimiento Popular Neuquino, a coup against progressive President Arturo Frondizi that March prevented Sapag from taking office.  Eventually becoming governor in 1963-66 and 1973–76, he presided over one of Argentina's fastest-growing provinces. The national government established the University of Neuquén in 1964, later incorporated into the new National University of Comahue in 1971. Removed as governor following the violent March 1976 coup against Isabel Perón, Felipe Sapag was returned to office in 1983-87 and 1995-99. His emphasis on public works and political independence from Buenos Aires have helped him and his successors with the MPN win every province-wide election since. His brother Elias Sapag became senator in 1963-66, 1973–76 and from 1983 until his death in 1993, becoming the longest-serving senator in national history. The MPN also elected Governors Pedro Salvatori (1987–91), Jorge Sobisch (1991–95 and 1999–2007) and current Governor Jorge Sapag (2007–11).

Neuquén has, since 1955, become a prosperous province with a high impact on the national energy supply and, as a growing tourist destination, outperforming most other provinces in the Patagonia region and in Argentina.

Geography

The province's limits are the Colorado River to the northeast, separating it from the Mendoza Province, the Limay River to the southeast toward the Río Negro Province, and the Andes mountains to the west, separating it from Chile.

There are two main distinctive landscapes; the mountainous fertile valleys with forest on the west, and the arid plateau with fertile land only near the basins of the rivers on the east, mostly the Limay River and Neuquén River.

The lacustrine system includes other less-important rivers such as the Aluminé River, the Malleo, and the Picún Leufú River, and a series of lakes including Nahuel Huapi Lake (550 km²), shared with Río Negro Province, Aluminé Lake (58 km²), Lácar Lake (49 km²), Huechulaufquen Lake (110 km²), Lolog Lake (35 km²), Traful, Hermoso, Quillén, Ñorquinco, Tromen and Falkner.

The province is home to the magnificent Arrayanes (Luma apiculata) forest at the Los Arrayanes National Park. Other National parks include Lanín National Park and the Lanín extinct volcano, the Nahuel Huapí National Park shared with Río Negro Province, and the Laguna Blanca National Park.

Climate

Neuquén Province, being relatively far away from both the Atlantic coast and the Pacific ocean by the Andes mountains, which help to block most moisture coming from the Pacific Ocean results in a climate that is the most continental in Patagonia with large diurnal ranges.

Temperature
Mean temperatures are relatively cold for its latitude due to the high altitude. The coldest areas are located in the Andean region where mean annual temperatures are below  or even below  at the highest peaks.

Humidity and precipitation
Humidity throughout the province varies significantly, depending on the location. The Andean region has a mean humidity exceeding 60% or even 70% due to lower temperatures while in the eastern parts, humidity is lower owing to higher temperatures. In all locations, humidity is significantly lower during the summer than in the winter.

Because the Andes block most of the moisture from the Pacific Ocean from coming in, causing it to release most of the precipitation on its western slopes, most of the province is dry, averaging less than  a year. Northern and eastern parts of the province have mean annual precipitation exceeding . This area represents a transitional climate between the more arid east and the wetter climates to the west and has a Mediterranean like precipitation pattern, similar to central Chile. This is due to the seasonal migration of the South Pacific Anticyclone. Summer months are drier since the South Pacific high is more southwards, inhibiting rainfall. During the winter months, this high is displaced to the north, allowing frontal and low pressure systems from the west to come in, resulting in higher precipitation during this season. As such, most of the precipitation in this area falls during the winter months.

Wind and sunshine
The winds in the province are moderately strong (slightly stronger in the south) and play a role in making most of the province arid by favoring evaporation. The predominant wind directions are from the west or southwest, which occur 40–50% of the time. In general, high altitude areas and flat areas receive stronger winds while summers tend to be windier than winters.

Cloud cover in the province varies widely with the eastern parts receiving less cloud cover than the Andean region which tends to be cloudier. Winters tend to be cloudier than summers with mean daily sunshine hours ranging from a high of 11 hours/day in January to a low of 3 hours in June.

Economy

Neuquen is one of Argentina's most prosperous provinces, its estimated 47.648 billion Peso (about US$10.495 billion) economy in 2012, or, 80,566 pesos (US$17,744) per capita.

No province in Argentina, however, is as dependent on any one sector as is Neuquen's.  Roughly half its output is accounted for by its mining and extractive sector, mainly on account of its massive gas and petroleum production, the most important in Argentina.  That dependency is only likely to increase:  development of the province's huge unconventional hydrocarbon reserves is beginning, above all in the Vaca Muerta formation.

The province generates a significant part of Patagonia's electric power through the hydroelectric plants of Piedra del Águila, El Chocón, Pichi Picún Leufú, Planicie Banderita (in the Cerros Colorados Complex), and Alicurá.  The town of Arroyito hosts the only heavy water plant in the country.

Another important activity is the production of apples, pears, peaches and others, specially in the Alto Valle area, shared with Río Negro.

The piquetero movement (organizations of unemployed workers) was born in Neuquén in the 1990s, during the presidency of Carlos Menem.

Tourism

See also Tourism in Argentina article
A destination of many Argentines and foreigners, the province has a number of year-round attractions, including:
 San Martín de los Andes
 Villa La Angostura
 Los Arrayanes National Park
 Lanín National Park
 Nahuel Huapí National Park
 Laguna Blanca National Park
 Copahue hot baths.

During the winter, there are the ski resorts in Chapelco, Cerro Bayo and Caviahue.

Many hike or fish, mainly for river trout, the lake district region of Southwestern Neuquén that stretches into Río Negro and Chubut Provinces.

There were a number of dinosaurs in the area, of which the bones of a 95 million years old Argentinosaurus are in display at the Carmen Funes Museum in Plaza Huincul.

Government 
The provincial government is divided into the usual three branches: the executive, headed by a popularly elected governor, who appoint the cabinet; the legislative; and the judiciary, headed by the Supreme Court.

The Constitution of Neuquén Province forms the formal law of the province.

In Argentina, the most important law enforcement organization is the Argentine Federal Police but the additional work is carried out by the Neuquén Provincial Police.

Political division

 

The province is divided into 16 departments.

Villages
 

La Buitrera
Mari Menuco

Notable people

 Marcos Acuña, football player
 Gregorio Álvarez, physician and historian
 Stephanie Beatriz, actor
 , poet
 Raúl di Blasio, pianist
 , poet
 , poet

 , bishop

 
 Rubens Sambueza, football player
 Felipe Sapag, politician
 , Mapuche chieftain

 Mario Daniel Vega, football player

See also 
 Buenos Aires Great Southern Railway
 Ferrocarril General Roca
 Servicios Ferroviarios Patagónico

References

External links
 
 Neuquen Province Official Website
 Neuquen Province Official Tourism Website
 Argentour Neuquen Province

 
Provinces of Argentina
Patagonia
States and territories established in 1955
1955 establishments in Argentina